General William R. Looney III, USAF (born March 5, 1949) was the 28th Commander, Air Education and Training Command (AETC), Randolph Air Force Base, Texas. As commander, he was responsible for the recruiting, training and education of Air Force personnel. His command included the Air Force Recruiting Service, two numbered air forces and Air University. Air Education and Training Command consists of 13 bases, more than 66,000 active-duty members and 15,000 civilians. General Looney was succeeded by General Stephen R. Lorenz on July 2, 2008, and retired from the Air Force on August 1, 2008. Since his retirement from the Air Force, Looney has taken a position as a board member at Trident University International.

Education
Looney graduated from the United States Air Force Academy in 1972, where he commanded the cadet wing in his senior year. His academic credentials include:

1972 Bachelor of Science degree, United States Air Force Academy, Colorado Springs, Colorado
1977 Squadron Officer School, Maxwell AFB, Alabama
1979 Master's degree in management, Central Michigan University
1983 Armed Forces Staff College, Norfolk, Virginia
1990 National War College, Fort Lesley J. McNair, Washington, D.C.
1993 Executive Warfare Course, Eglin AFB, Florida
1997 Joint Flag Officer Warfighting Course, Maxwell AFB, Alabama
1997 Joint Force Air Component Commander Course, Maxwell AFB, Alabama
1997 National Security Leadership Course, Syracuse University and Johns Hopkins University, Baltimore, Maryland
1998 Undergraduate Space and Missile Training Staff Course, Vandenberg AFB, California
1999 National and International Security Seminar, John F. Kennedy School of Government, Harvard University, Cambridge, Massachusetts

Assignments
Looney has commanded a flight, a fighter squadron, two fighter wings, an air expeditionary force, a military college, a warfare center, a numbered air force and two acquisition centers. His assignments:

June 1972 - August 1973, student, undergraduate pilot training], Sheppard AFB, Texas
August 1973 - December 1974, AC-130 gunship pilot, Ubon Royal Thai AFB, Thailand
January 1975 - April 1978, T-38 instructor pilot, 50th Flying Training Squadron, Columbus Air Force Base
April 1978 - April 1979, participant, Air Staff Training Program, Directorate of Personnel Plans, The Pentagon, Washington, D.C.
April 1979 - December 1979, student, F-15 training, Luke AFB, Arizona
January 1980 - February 1983, instructor pilot, flight commander and assistant operations officer, 94th Tactical Fighter Squadron, Langley AFB, Virginia
February 1983 - July 1983, student, Armed Forces Staff College, Norfolk, Virginia.
July 1983 - June 1985, aide-de-camp to Deputy Commander in Chief, U.S. European Command, Stuttgart, West Germany
July 1985 - November 1986, Chief of Wing Plans, 36th Tactical Fighter Wing, Bitburg Air Base, West Germany
November 1986 - January 1988, operations officer, 22nd Tactical Fighter Squadron, Bitburg AB, West Germany
January 1988 - June 1989, Commander, 22nd Tactical Fighter Squadron, Bitburg AB, West Germany
July 1989 - June 1990, student, National War College, Fort Lesley J. McNair, Washington, D.C.
June 1990 - July 1992, Conventional Negotiations Branch Chief, Directorate of Strategic Plans and Policy, Office of the Joint Chiefs of Staff, Washington, D.C.
July 1992 - June 1993, Vice Commander, Air Forces Iceland, Keflavik Naval Air Station, Iceland
June 1993 - May 1995, Commander, 33rd Fighter Wing, Eglin Air Force Base, Florida.
May 1995 - July 1996, Commander, 1st Fighter Wing, Langley Air Force Base, Virginia, and Air Expeditionary Force II, Azraq, Jordan
July 1996 - June 1998, Commandant, Armed Forces Staff College, Norfolk, Virginia
June 1998 - May 1999, Commander, Space Warfare Center, Schriever AFB, Colorado
May 1999 - June 2000, Director of Operations, Headquarters Air Force Space Command, Peterson AFB, Colorado
June 2000 - May 2002, Commander, 14th Air Force, and Component Commander, Space Air Forces, U.S. Space Command, Vandenberg AFB, California
May 2002 - December 2003, Commander, Electronic Systems Center, Air Force Materiel Command, Hanscom AFB, Massachusetts
December 2003 - June 2005, Commander, Aeronautical Systems Center, Wright-Patterson AFB, Ohio
June 2005 - July 2008, Commander, Air Education and Training Command, Randolph AFB, Texas
July 2008 - Retired (Effective August 1)

Flight information
General Looney flew 62 combat hours in the F-15 Eagle in support of Operation Southern Watch and commanded Joint Task Force 86–2 in support of Operation Uphold Democracy. He is a command pilot with more than 3,900 flying hours, including 2,500 in the F-15.

Rating: Command pilot
Flight hours: More than 3,900
Aircraft flown: AC-130, T-38, T-37, F-15 and C-21

Awards and decorations

The General received the Order of the Sword in 2008.

Promotion Dates
Second Lieutenant June 7, 1972
First Lieutenant June 7, 1974
Captain June 7, 1976
Major November 1, 1981
Lieutenant Colonel March 1, 1986
Colonel March 1, 1991
Brigadier General March 1, 1996
Major General May 1, 1999
Lieutenant General June 1, 2002
General August 1, 2005

Quotes
"The vast majority of Airmen we train are going to be somewhere in harm's way within the next year or two. It is up to us to impart to them the talent and skill they need to accomplish their mission in a world-class fashion and at the same time make sure we get them back safely to the families that love them."
http://www.aetc.af.mil/news/story.asp?id=123067441

References
This article includes text in the public domain from the United States Air Force.
, Air Force Link, United States Air Force.  Retrieved on 2006-07-09.

External links

Living people
Recipients of the Legion of Merit
United States Air Force generals
United States Air Force Academy alumni
Central Michigan University alumni
Recipients of the Air Medal
1949 births
Recipients of the Order of the Sword (United States)
Recipients of the Defense Superior Service Medal
Recipients of the Air Force Distinguished Service Medal